Ken Coar is a software developer known for his participation in the creation of The Apache Software Foundation.

Open source
Coar has been active in open software projects, and lectures internationally about open development methodologies and distributed collaboration.

See also
 Apache Software Foundation
 Habari
 Open Source Initiative
 PHP
 RubyGems

References

American bloggers
American computer programmers
Free software programmers
Linux people
Living people
Members of the Open Source Initiative board of directors
1960 births